The National Tainan Living Arts Center is an arts center in West Central District, Tainan, Taiwan. It handles the cultural-related affairs among communities for the counties in southern Taiwan.

History
The center was originally initiated in early 1954 as Provincial Tainan Social Education Hall by Taiwan Provincial Government. In June 1954, the preparatory committee was established. On 11 June 1955, it was officially established. It was located in the former Tainan Public Hall during the Japanese rule of Taiwan with a site area of 0.6 hectare. Over the time due to the limited space, the education department of the provincial government established a new site for the center on 15 March 1989. The new site occupied a total area of 2.52 hectares and was located at the 5th redevelopment zone of Tainan. The first phase of the construction commenced in 1992 and completed in February 1994 in which the administration hall was constructed. In July 1994, the personnel of the center moved to the new venue. On 29 October 1994, the new site was officially inaugurated. The second phase construction started in January 1995 and finished in December 1998 which saw the completion of the performance and exhibition hall. On 15 May 1997, the Culture and Education Division of the provincial government was formed and the center became the subordinate of the division. On 1 July 1999, the center became the subordinate of the Ministry of Education. On 19 September 2007, the Research, Development and Evaluation Commission proposed an adjustment to the management of the center that it shall became the subordinate of Council for Cultural Affairs. On 23 January 2008, the Executive Yuan approved the proposal. The center was then later inaugurated as National Tainan Living Arts Center on 6 March 2008. On 18 May 2012, the Executive Yuan issued a mandate to make the center become the subordinate of National Taiwan Museum of Fine Arts and was approved on 25 May 2012.

Architecture
The art center consists of an 838-seated capacity performance hall for cultural and artistic events and 7 medium and small conference rooms with a total seating capacity of 288 people for conference or meeting-style events.

Events
The art center regularly hosts various art-related events, such as culture and art forums, life crafts workshops, life crafts and folklore exhibition and performance etc.

Transportation
The art center is accessible by bus from Tainan Station of Taiwan Railways.

See also
 List of tourist attractions in Taiwan

References

External links
 

1955 establishments in Taiwan
Art centers in Tainan
Arts organizations established in 1955